Julia Emilia Valdés Borrero (born February 26, 1952, in Santiago de Cuba, Cuba) is a Cuban artist specializing in painting, drawing, engraving, and illustration.

From 1967 to 1972, she studied in the Escuela Nacional de Arte (ENA), in Havana, Cuba. Between 1984 and 1989 she studied art history at the Universidad de Oriente in Santiago de Cuba.

Individual exhibitions
Between 1982 and 1998, she presented several solo exhibitions, both in Cuba and in Europe.
 1982: "Músicos y Palmas, Havana
 1989: Exposition Peintures de Choy, Julia Valdés, Manuel Pozo, Bordeaux, France
 1993: Paintings. Julia Valdés/Alberto Lescay, Berlin, Germany
 1996: Día Imaginario. Julia Valdés Borrero, Havana
 1998: De máscaras y otras imágenes. Julia Valdés, Santiago de Cuba

Collective exhibitions
 1992: De otra isla. Muesta colectiva de pintores cubanos, Santo Domingo, Dominican Republic
 1993: Neve Cubanische Malerel (Six Cuban Fine Artists), Speyer, Germany
 1994: Arte de Cuba, Barcelona, Spain
 1995: 1er. Salón de Arte Cubano Contemporáneo, Havana

Awards
 1973:  Prize at the Salón Nacional de Profesores e Instructores de Artes Plásticas, Museo Nacional de Bellas Artes, Havana
 1979: Prize in the Concurso Nacional de Vitrales, for the Consejo de Estado, Havana
 1980: Prize in Painting, at the VIII Salón Nacional Juvenil de Artes Plásticas, Museo Nacional de Bellas Artes, Havana
 1981: First Prize in Drawing, in the Salón Homenaje al 467 Aniversario de la Fundación de la Ciudad, Galería Oriente, Santiago de Cuba
 1989: Prize in Illustration, in the Concurso Nacional "El Arte del Libro" [for illustrations of the book Cuentos de la vida y la muerte], Havana

Collections
 Galería Propuesta, Santo Domingo, Dominican Republic
 Galerie Kisch, Berlin, Germany
 Museo Emilio Bacardí, Santiago de Cuba
 Museo Nacional de Bellas Artes de La Habana, Havana
 Galerie Wünsch, Linz, Austria

References

  Jose Veigas-Zamora, Cristina Vives Gutierrez, Adolfo V. Nodal, Valia Garzon, Dannys Montes de Oca. Memoria: Cuban Art of the 20th Century. California/International Arts Foundation, 2001. 
 Jose Viegas. Memoria: Artes Visuales Cubanas Del Siglo Xx''. California International Arts,  2004.   

1952 births
Living people
20th-century Cuban women artists
21st-century Cuban women artists
Cuban contemporary artists